Glasnevin is an unincorporated community in Key West Rural Municipality No. 70 in the province of Saskatchewan, Canada. Located on highway 13, it is approximately 10 km west of Ogema.

See also
 List of communities in Saskatchewan
 List of Canadian tornadoes and tornado outbreaks

References

Unincorporated communities in Saskatchewan
Key West No. 70, Saskatchewan
Division No. 2, Saskatchewan